Super Star is a 2002 Kannada film written by Upendra and directed by Nagathihalli Chandrashekhar, starring Upendra and Keerthi Reddy. Though initially it was started as a remake of the Hindi film Agnisakshi , the story was modified after the Nepalese royal massacre involving Dipendra- the tragedy that struck the family of the Nepal king. The movie is noted for having four climaxes which the audience could select according to their mindset. All these climaxes were based on the thought process of the character Sigaev found in Anton Chekhov's 1887 short story An Avenger. As of 2021, this was Keerthi Reddy's only Kannada film. Nagathihalli Chandrashekhar had mentioned in an interview that, although he was credited as the director, he was not given much freedom on the sets and Upendra was the one who took decisions regarding the shoot of the movie. It was dubbed into Telugu as Stupid, which was a lot more successful than the Kannada version.

Cast
 Upendra as Dipendra of Nepal / Rock Star Ricky 
 Keerthi Reddy as Devyani Rana
 V. Manohar as psychyatrist
 Nagathihalli Chandrashekhar in a guest appearance
 Karthik Sharma

Soundtrack
The music for the movie was composed and lyrics were penned by Hamsalekha. The track "Thagole Thagole" was a chartbuster.

Critical reception
The reaction from the critics turned out to be mostly negative upon the film's release. While the performances of the lead artistes, unique story line of the film, soundtrack, background music and other technical aspects of the film were praised, the screenplay of the film was the most criticized by the critics as well as the audiences.

Box office

Karnataka
Superstar had an extremely strong opening at the box office across Karnataka similar to the earlier record breaking openers of Upendra and set the box office on fire during its opening weekend. The film continued to storm the box office during its initial weeks, but failed to live up to the expectations and most of the fans were disappointed by the movie. Superstar ended up becoming a below average grosser in Karnataka by running only for 6 weeks in its main centre in Bangalore. The film was sold to distributors at a very high distribution price and got an extraordinary opening in its initial weeks, thus returning investment for the producer. Compared to Upendra's earlier blockbuster movies like A, Upendra, Preethse, H2O, this film was considered as average hit as it returned investment for the producer.

Andhra Pradesh
The Telugu dubbed version of Superstar which was released in Andhra Pradesh in 2003 (a year after its original Kannada release) was titled as Stupid - O Pichi Vadi Prema Katha and had a fantastic opening across Andhra Pradesh, owing mainly to Upendra's loyal Telugu fan following which he had gained due to the large success of the Telugu versions of his earlier blockbuster movies like A and Upendra which not only starred him but were also directed by him, and a few straight Telugu movies like Raa and Kanyadanam which were box office hits. Although Superstar was just an average grosser in Karnataka, Stupid surprisingly turned out to be a hit in Andhra Pradesh by completing 100 days of run and its distributors in Andhra Pradesh earned fair profits from the movie.

See also
Nepalese royal massacre
Dipendra of Nepal
Devyani Rana

References

External links

Films set in India
2002 films
2000s Kannada-language films
Films scored by Hamsalekha
Indian films based on actual events
Films directed by Nagathihalli Chandrashekhar